Nepenthes × mirabilata (a blend of mirabilis and alata) is a natural hybrid involving N. alata and N. mirabilis.

Nepenthes × mirabilata was mentioned as a natural hybrid in Guide to Nepenthes Hybrids (1995).  The hybrid is restricted to Mindanao, the Philippines, the only location where the parent species overlap.

References

 McPherson, S.R. & V.B. Amoroso 2011. Field Guide to the Pitcher Plants of the Philippines. Redfern Natural History Productions, Poole.
 CP Database: Nepenthes × mirabilata

Carnivorous plants of Asia
mirabilata
Nomina nuda
Flora of Mindanao
Plants described in 1995